(born May 13, 1985) is a Japanese Nordic combined skier who has been competing since 2002. He won a gold medal in the 4 x 5 km team event at the FIS Nordic World Ski Championships 2009 in Liberec and earned his best individual finish of sixth in the 10 km individual normal hill event at those same championships.

Minato's best World Cup finish was 12th twice (2008, 2009). His lone victory was in the 7.5 km sprint event at Pragelato in 2007.

References
FIS profile

1985 births
Japanese male Nordic combined skiers
Living people
Olympic Nordic combined skiers of Japan
Nordic combined skiers at the 2010 Winter Olympics
Nordic combined skiers at the 2014 Winter Olympics
FIS Nordic World Ski Championships medalists in Nordic combined
Universiade medalists in nordic combined
Universiade gold medalists for Japan
Competitors at the 2005 Winter Universiade
Competitors at the 2007 Winter Universiade